Proteothrinax baumgartneri is an extinct species of shark. It was classified based on two relatively complete teeth and two isolated crowns, described from the Eocene (Lutetian) Weitwies Subformation in Austria. Due to the limited material available and its similarities to Chlamydoselachus fiedleri, it has been suggested that the criteria with which P. baumgartneri is separated from Chlamydoselachus fiedleri are within the normal variation of Chlamydoselachus.  This would therefore make P. baumgartneri a junior synonym to Chlamydoselachus fiedleri and, since there is only one identified species within genus Proteothrinax, the whole genus a junior synonym to Chlamydoselachus.

References

Chlamydoselachidae
Eocene fish of Europe
Eocene sharks